Albenga Cathedral (Duomo di Albenga) is a Roman Catholic cathedral dedicated to Saint Michael in the city of Albenga, in the province of Savona and the region of Liguria, Italy. It is the seat of the Diocese of Albenga-Imperia.

A church has occupied the site since the turn of the 4th to the 5th century, but the present structure is medieval, built in about 1100, with a major rebuilding in the second half of the 12th century, and another in 1582. A restoration project in the 1970s largely returned the building to the medieval structure. The bell tower was rebuilt in its present form in the 1390s.

The relics of Saint Veranus (San Verano), who was instrumental in the Christianisation of Albenga in the 6th century, are preserved in a shrine.

The cathedral interior is well stocked with sculptures and works of art. The 19th century ceiling frescos are by Maurizio and Tommaso Carrega. Other frescos, particularly those in the apse, are of the 15th century. The right hand nave contains a fresco by the artist Il Pancalino of Saint Clare and two donors, and of the Crucifixion with Saints Anthony the Great and John the Evangelist, with the bishop of Albenga. The altarpiece on the high altar depicts Saint Veranus, Saint Michael and John the Baptist.

The cathedral also owns two paintings of the late 14th century by Luca Baudo of Saint Eligius and Saint Ampelius; a painting of the Miracle of St. Veranus by Giovanni Lanfranco; and a Madonna and Child with Saints by Orazio de Ferrari (the last two are not publicly displayed for security reasons).

Name 
Name
All the written documentation in our possession assigns the title of the Cathedral of ingauna to St. Michael the Archangel. A tradition has it that on the road that leads from Albenga to Alassio there was a snake that killed anyone who passed. The population made a procession praying to St. Michael the Archangel to kill the snake. During the night a glow was seen coming from the sky and heading towards a point on the road; the population rushed in, and found the snake killed.

The protection of San Michele was widespread in the Lombards period, when the people in arms invoked the Saint and to whose effigy they swore fidelity before the fight. However, the proliferation of the cult dates back to the Byzantine era, and at the time the city of Albenga had close commercial relations with the Byzantine Empire, so the title of the cathedral to San Michele can place us at its first building.

However, documents emerged for which it was thought that for some time it could have been attributed to San Giovanni: the first document dates back to 1076 and dealt with the sale of a mill, in which the presence of eleven Sancti Iohannis milites is mentioned. The document by which the bishop of Albenga donated churches in the surroundings of Porto Maurizio to the Lérins Abbey dates back to 1103, the donation provided for a quoque anno aecclesia Sancti Iohannis ac Sancti Michaelis Albinguinensis aecclesie reddat solidos duos ...; this document, however, does not give the cathedral the double name, but speaks of two separate structures. Still documents that have also come down to us from the Templars include the church of San Giovanni. However, this was explained by analyzing all the documentation, that is, the cathedral-baptistery complex was built together, and it is likely that the baptistery itself was named after St. John the Baptist as a place of baptism and that the diocese referred to this structure as one of the main places of episcopal reference.

Albenga had its name linked to that of military saints, from Saint Calocero to Martin of Tours, but also in the church of St. George, or in the findings of the church of St. Teodoro, since the fortifications built by Costanzo created a city militarized in the Byzantine period.

History
 
Located in the center of the medieval city of Albenga, the foundation of the original building of worship date back to the reconstruction of the city (between the 4th and early 5th centuries), in the center of the Roman city. It stands on the site with the exact dimensions of the early Christian one. Its rebuilding occurred around 1100, on the ruins of the early Christian church, and again in the second half of the 20th century.

According to tradition, in the road that leads from Albenga to Alassio, there was a snake that killed everyone. The people made a procession praying Archangel Michael to kill the snake. During the night he saw a glow coming from the sky and head towards a point on the road, people noticed quickly, and found the snake killed.

The first plant 

An early study of ancient plant early Christian was undertaken between 1964 and 1967 where he ascertained that the structure was a very large basilica. Archaeological excavation discovered the foundations of two column that enriched the altar. With the invasion of Liguria by Lombard king Rothari in 643 that the church was reduced to one aisle Central.

Thanks to the division of Liguria in marches, which increased the importance of Albenga and his diocese, the plant was rebuilt in the 11th century in forms to proto-Romanesque nave and crypt. The steps of this reconstruction are still visible in the lower wall of the facade.

Structure 
The cathedral is today divided into a nave and two aisles with the original columns and pillars supporting ogival arches. Interventions by Nino Lamboglia also allowed the deletion of the elements baroque from sanctuary, now raised to liturgical requirements and to make the proto-Romanesque crypt more visible.

The various structural stages that followed are clearly visible in the outside facade, which shows a rose window and decoration arches. The adjacent bell  tower was rebuilt between 1391 and 1395 by the architect-canonical Serafino Mignano with the help of master builders Oberto and Tommaso Caressia. An example of Late Gothic architecture, it has five rows of mullioned windows culminating with a polygonal cusp featuring pinnacles at the four corners.

References

Sources and external links
 Diocese of Albenga-Imperia website 
 SBAPGE website: Albenga Cathedral 
 Provincia Savona website: Cattedrale di San Michele 

Roman Catholic cathedrals in Italy
Churches in the province of Savona
Cathedrals in Liguria
12th-century Roman Catholic church buildings in Italy